Kirovsky is a rural locality (a settlement) in Beregovoy Selsoviet of Zeysky District, Amur Oblast, Russia. The population was 23 as of 2018. There are 3 streets.

Geography 
Kirovsky is located in the valley of the Dzhelta River, 126 km north of Zeya (the district's administrative centre) by road. Zolotaya Gora is the nearest rural locality.

References 

Rural localities in Zeysky District